Kanni Penn is a 1969 Indian Tamil-language film directed by A. Kasilingam and produced by R. M. Veerappan. The film stars Jaishankar and Vanisri. It was released on 11 September 1969.

Plot 

A young man comes across a crossroad in his life where he is forced to make a few important and difficult decisions.

Cast 
 Jaishankar
 Vanisri
 Lakshmi
 Sivakumar
 Vennira Aadai Nirmala
 Cho
 V. K. Ramasamy

Production 
Kanni Penn was directed by A. Kasilingam and produced by R. M. Veerappan under Sathya Movies. Cinematography was handled by Vijayan.

Themes 
The film attempts to project the ideals of C. N. Annadurai: duty, dignity and decency.

Soundtrack 
The soundtrack was composed by M. S. Viswanathan. Lyrics were written by Vaali, Alangudi Somu and Avinasimani.

Release and reception 
Kanni Penn was released on 11 September 1969. The critic from The Indian Express criticised the film's length of 19 reels but wrote, "[Jaishankar] is getting acceptable as an actor. [Vanisri] as the girl in miserable circumstances gives a very good account of herself. In fact, she is the best in the movie."

References

External links 

1960s Tamil-language films
Films scored by M. S. Viswanathan